Creswell railway station serves the village Creswell in Derbyshire, England. The station is on the Robin Hood Line between Nottingham and Worksop. It is also the nearest station to the larger village of Clowne.

History
The line and the station was built by the Midland Railway. The station was designed by the Midland Railway company architect John Holloway Sanders.  

On 24 February 1886 it was renamed as Elmton and Creswell to prevent confusion with the nearby Creswell and Welbeck station opened by the LD&ECR in 1897 and closed at the outbreak of WW2.

Stationmasters

E. Barber 1876 - 1878 (formerly station master at Pinxton)
G.C. Hawkins 1878 - 1880 (formerly station master at Harrow Road)
Ultimus Jackson 1880 - 1909 
Arthur Jackson 1910 - 1921 (afterwards station master at Stamford)
George Palmer 1921 - 1926 (formerly station master at Armathwaite)
W.D. Rattue 1926 - 1935  (formerly station master at Clowne)

Branch line
A branch line veered west immediately north of the station. Its remains are still plainly visible from the north end of the platforms and from Worksop trains. It closed to normal passenger traffic in 1954, though Summer holiday trains to  continued until 1962.

It remained open to freight traffic until the 1980s when the combination of an underground fire and the need to replace tracks led to its closure. The trackbed was formally protected in case a use was found, such as for opencast traffic or for access to the Markham Enterprise Growth Zone at M1 Junction 29A although this never came into fruition and the tracks were removed and the area landscaped to create the Clowne Branch Line Greenway, a shared bike and walking trail starting in Creswell and culminating at Poolsbrook Country Park.

Services
All services at Creswell are operated by East Midlands Railway.

There is currently no Sunday service at the station since the previous service of four trains per day was withdrawn in 2011. Sunday services at the station are due to recommence at the station during the life of the East Midlands franchise.

References

External links

Railway stations in Derbyshire
DfT Category F2 stations
Former Midland Railway stations
Railway stations in Great Britain opened in 1875
Railway stations in Great Britain closed in 1964
Railway stations in Great Britain opened in 1998
Beeching closures in England
Railway stations served by East Midlands Railway
Reopened railway stations in Great Britain
John Holloway Sanders railway stations